Bryseae or Bryseai (Βρυσεαί, or Βρυσιαί) was a town of ancient Laconia, southwest of Sparta, at the foot of the ordinary exit from Mount Taygetus. Its name occurs in Homer's Iliad, but it had dwindled down to a small village in the time of Pausanias, who mentions, however, a temple of Dionysus at the place, into which women alone were permitted to enter, and of which they performed the sacred rites. William Martin Leake claimed to have discovered the site of Bryseae at the village of Sinánbey near Sklavokóri (modern Amykles). He remarks that the marble from Sklavokhóri, which was presented by the Earl of Aberdeen to the British Museum, probably came from the above-mentioned temple at Bryseae: it bears the name of two priestesses, and represents various articles of female apparel. Leake found another marble at Sinánbey, which is also in the British Museum. Leake's claims notwithstanding, modern scholars treat Bryseae's site as unlocated.

References

Populated places in ancient Laconia
Former populated places in Greece
Locations in the Iliad